Ayyampalayam is a village which comes under Punjai Thottakurichi town Panchayat, in Karur district in the Indian state of Tamil Nadu. This village mainly depends upon agriculture.

External links
Google maps

Villages in Karur district